Gustaf Rudolf "Gus" Lawson (April 3, 1882 – September 8, 1913) was a record holding professional cyclist who died in a race.

Biography

Gus Lawson was born as Gustaf Rudolph Larsson on April 3, 1882 in Norrköping, Sweden to Lars Gustaf Larsson (1847–c.1940) and Emma Sofia Sundberg (1845–1888). He had two siblings, Iver Lawson and John Lawson, both professional cyclists.

In 1900 he set the indoor 1 hour record by cycling 34 and 5/8 miles.

He died on September 8, 1913 while riding in a 100-kilometer race in Cologne, Germany when a tire burst on the pace motorcycle he was riding. He fractured his skull and both arms.

References

1882 births
1913 deaths
American male cyclists
Sportspeople from Norrköping
Cyclists who died while racing
Sport deaths in Germany
Swedish male cyclists
Swedish emigrants to the United States